Liu Jianli (4 April 1956 – 18 February 2015) was a Chinese basketball player who competed in the 1984 Summer Olympics.

References

1956 births
2015 deaths
Chinese men's basketball players
Olympic basketball players of China
Basketball players at the 1984 Summer Olympics
Asian Games medalists in basketball
Basketball players at the 1982 Asian Games
Asian Games silver medalists for China
Medalists at the 1982 Asian Games